1272 Gefion, provisional designation , is a stony asteroid and parent body of the Gefion family from the central region of the asteroid belt, approximately 7 kilometers in diameter. It was discovered on 10 October 1931, by astronomer Karl Reinmuth at the Heidelberg Observatory in Germany. The asteroid was named after Gefjon from Norse mythology.

Orbit and classification 

Gefion is the namesake and parent body of the Gefion family, a large family of stony asteroids in the intermediate main belt. The family is also a suspected source of the L chondrites, common group of meteorites.

It orbits the Sun in the central main-belt at a distance of 2.4–3.2 AU once every 4 years and 8 months (1,697 days; semi-major axis of 2.78 AU). Its orbit has an eccentricity of 0.15 and an inclination of 8° with respect to the ecliptic.

The body's observation arc begins at Heidelberg, six days after its official discovery observation.

Physical characteristics 

In the SMASS classification, Gefion is a Sl-subtype that transitions from the common stony S-type asteroids to the rather rare L-types.

Rotation period 

In 2010 and 2011, two rotational lightcurves of Gefion were obtained from photometric observations in the R-band by astronomers at the Palomar Transient Factory in California . Lightcurve analysis gave a rotation period of 2.900 and 3.087 hours with a brightness amplitude of 0.22 and 0.20 magnitude, respectively.

Diameter and albedo 

According to the survey carried out by the NEOWISE mission of NASA's Wide-field Infrared Survey Explorer, Gefion measures between 6.965 and 7.016 kilometers in diameter and its surface has an albedo between 0.2489 and 0.252. The Collaborative Asteroid Lightcurve Link assumes a standard albedo for carbonaceous asteroids of 0.057 and consequently calculates a much larger diameter of 12.62 kilometers based on an absolute magnitude of 13.22.

Naming 

This minor planet was named after Gefjon a goddess in Norse mythology. It is also named for the Gefion Fountain in Copenhagen, Denmark. The official naming citation was mentioned in The Names of the Minor Planets by Paul Herget in 1955.

References

External links 
 Is the Gefion Dynamical Asteroid Family the Source of the LChondrites?, 78th Annual Meeting of the Meteoritical Society (2015)
 Asteroid Lightcurve Database (LCDB), query form (info )
 Dictionary of Minor Planet Names, Google books
 Asteroids and comets rotation curves, CdR – Observatoire de Genève, Raoul Behrend
 Discovery Circumstances: Numbered Minor Planets (1)-(5000) – Minor Planet Center
 
 

001272
Discoveries by Karl Wilhelm Reinmuth
Named minor planets
001272
19311010